C. commutata may refer to:

 Calceolaria commutata, a plant endemic to Ecuador
 Canna commutata, a garden plant
 Convallaria commutata, a North American plant
 Costellaria commutata, a sea snail